The 1877 Napier by-election was a by-election held in the Napier electorate during the 6th New Zealand Parliament, on 15 February 1877.

The by-election was caused by the death of incumbent MP Donald McLean and was won by Fred Suttton. John Buchanan, Henry Stokes Tiffen, William Colenso, and William Barnard Rhodes were the unsuccessful candidates, with Sutton subsequently elected with a majority of 23 votes. Richmond Beetham (eldest son of William Beetham) acted as returning officer. Rhodes had retired from the election but was still regarded as an official candidate.

Results 
The following table gives the results of the by-election:

References

1877 elections in New Zealand
February 1877 events
Napier 1877
Politics of the Hawke's Bay Region